The  is a river in the Chubu region of Japan roughly  long, flowing through the prefectures of Nagano, Gifu, Aichi, and Mie before emptying into Ise Bay a short distance away from the city of Nagoya. It is the main river of the Kiso Three Rivers (along with Ibi and Nagara rivers) and forms a major part of the Nōbi Plain. The valley around the upper portion of the river forms the Kiso Valley.

Parts of the Kiso River are sometimes referred to as the Japan Rhine because of its similarities to the Rhine in Europe.

Kiso River embankment
The  was built in the Edo period and extends for a 47-kilometer length between the cities of Inuyama and Yatomi to protect against flooding. After a portion of this embankment was rebuilt after having collapsed due to record floods in May 1884, local volunteers brought in 1800 saplings of sakura trees at the request of the governor of Aichi Prefecture, replacing Japanese red pine trees which had formerly lined the embankment.  These cherry blossoms included many unusual varieties including some wild cherry tree species, and specifically excluded the Somei Yoshino variety that had become extremely popular all over Japan. A seven-kilometer portion of this embankment between the cities of Ichinomiya and Kōnan has been designated as both a National Place of Scenic Beauty and Natural Monument since 1927.  The number of cherry trees gradually decreased due to natural attrition to less than 400 by 2001, but the city of Ichinomiya undertook a large-scale replanting campaign to bring the embankment back to its former appearance.

Other portions of the Kiso River in Inuyama, and Kakamigahara, Kani, and Sakahogi in Gifu Prefecture were designated collectively as a National Place of Scenic Beauty in 1934.

See also

Notes

References 
 Nussbaum, Louis Frédéric and Käthe Roth. (2005). Japan Encyclopedia. Cambridge: Harvard University Press. ; OCLC 48943301

External links 

 Kisogawa River Sand Data — a Japan Agency for Marine-Earth Science and Technology (JAMSTEC) website
 Cultural Properties of Aichi Prefecture 
  Aichi Now official site for Aichi Tourism 
 Konan City home page

Kiso Mountains
Rivers of Aichi Prefecture
Rivers of Gifu Prefecture
Rivers of Mie Prefecture
Rivers of Nagano Prefecture
Rivers of Japan